Akacieparken is a public housing estate on Valby Langgade in the Valby district of Copenhagen, Denmark. It was built in 1994–06 to design by Hvidt & M'lgaard on a former industrial site and contains 304 apartments.

References

External links 
 another list and pictures of public housing projects in Denmark
 Københavns Kommune - 11. Akacieparken 

Buildings and structures in Valby
Housing estates in Copenhagen
Buildings and structures completed in 1995
Public housing